The 1942 William & Mary Indians football team represented William & Mary during the 1942 college football season.

Schedule

NFL Draft selections

References

William and Mary
William & Mary Tribe football seasons
Southern Conference football champion seasons
William